Inside Lacrosse is a lacrosse media entity and ESPN affiliate. It includes many parts including a news website, an 11 times annual magazine, online video streaming, internet forums and an ESPN television show.  The company is currently headquartered in Baltimore, Maryland.

Properties

Inside Lacrosse Magazine
Currently published 11 times a year, the magazine is in an oversized glossy format, similar to Rolling Stone and ESPN The Magazine.  The page count averages anywhere from 136–172 pages depending on the time of year and main topics of interest are the men's college and high school lacrosse.  Also receiving coverage is Major League Lacrosse, the National Lacrosse League, and women's lacrosse.  Of the 11 issues, the most popular is the recruiting issue, followed by the college season preview issues.

Inside Lacrosse TV
Inside Lacrosse TV is the name of both Inside Lacrosse's video streaming website and their ESPN television show. The television show is a one-hour special that usually occurs twice annually as season "preview" and "summary" shows before and after the college season.

The Lacrosse Forums
, The Lacrosse Forums (TLF) has over 50,000 registered users making it the largest online lacrosse forums.

IL Indoor
IL Indoor is a National Lacrosse League news blog. Formerly known as "NLL Insider", it was started in 2005 as a spinoff to Inside Lacrosse so that Inside Lacrosse could focus on field lacrosse while IL Indoor would focus on box lacrosse. It features its own forums similar to The Lacrosse Forums. Some of the writers are former NLL players including Teddy Jenner, Brian Shanahan, Marty O'Neill, and Tom Ryan.

IL Indoor Forums
IL Indoor also has its own distinct message board forum, IL Indoor Forums which focuses primarily on National Lacrosse League news and discussions.  This message board began in 2000 and was originally known as the National Lacrosse League Message Board until Inside Lacrosse purchased and then renamed it.  It is the premier website for fan-based NLL journalism and is the location for serious NLL fans, staffers, and players to share news, rumors, opinions, and ideas for improving both the sport of box lacrosse and the NLL.  It also serves as a living repository of NLL history and as a resource for new NLL fans to learn about the league, its rules, and its history by searching past posts or interacting with long-time fans.

History 
The company was founded in 1996 by Robert Carpenter, a Duke lacrosse and Vestal, NY High School graduate. Knowing that fans cannot be truly invested in a sport if they don't have access to the news and the personalities surrounding it, Inside Lacrosse was born. A ham and egg operation run out of Carpenter's spare bedroom in Towson, Maryland was all about printing and sending weekly score bulletins to lacrosse junkies nationally, in first-class envelopes so nothing was out of date. The maiden issue was a 16-page black-and-white newspaper consisting mostly of box scores and stats. Among the content was the news of Michigan State and New Hampshire dropping their men's varsity programs and Syracuse's epic 22–21 win over Virginia. American City Business Journals acquired the magazine in 2007

Awards and honors 
1998 – USILA Media Award
2003 – IWLCA Media Award
2003 – IWLCA Service Award
2005 – USILA Media Award
2008 – FOLIO: Magazine Eddie Award - Consumer, Sports, Full Issue

References

External links

Inside Lacrosse TV
IL Indoor
IL Indoor Forums

Advance Publications
ESPN media outlets
Lacrosse mass media
Magazines published in Baltimore
Magazines published in Illinois